Night Work is the third studio album by American band Scissor Sisters. It was released on June 28, 2010, and was preceded by the release of the lead single "Fire with Fire" on June 20.

Background

Night Work is actually the fourth album that the band recorded. In 2008, the band played two secret gigs, billed as Queef Latina and Debbie's Hairy, where they tested some of their newly recorded material for a third album, including "The Other Girls", "Singularity", "Not the Loving Kind", "Uroboros", "Who's There?" and a cover of Roxy Music's single "Do the Strand". Other song titles mentioned by Jake Shears include "Who's Your Money", "Thanks for Asking", "Television", "Taking Shape", "Second Heart", "Number 1 in 3rd World", "Hey Now", "Major for You", "Dogs", "Hollywood Wives", "Permanent Wave", "Private Midnight", and "Sadistic". On May 8, 2010, Shears stated that the band had decided to scrap the material the previous year. Shears said of the decision, "If it wasn't something we could fully get behind and believe in, I think the band was going to be over."

"Do the Strand" was recorded and released in 2009 as a part of the War Child charity album War Child Presents Heroes, among several covers performed by Franz Ferdinand, Beck, Yeah Yeah Yeahs and others.

The band teamed up with producer Stuart Price to record completely new material.

The cover art is a 1980 Robert Mapplethorpe photograph of dancer Peter Reed's buttocks, which led to controversy among conservative people. When asked about the cover, guitarist and bass player Del Marquis stated, "The way someone reacts to it will tell you a lot about that person. People could view it with reactionary homophobia, or they could view it as camp, or high art, or something beautiful. It reminds me of the back of Sticky Fingers actually – it's a really classic-looking album cover" and added that it was controversial "because people still react in a really strange way to the sexualisation of the male form. We're much more comfortable with the sexualisation of the female form. The cover's been blown up on billboards all over town and it's really exciting for me to be driving through religiously conservative neighbourhoods and seeing this giant gorgeous clenched man's ass!"

Singles

The first single released from the album was "Fire with Fire", which met critical and commercial success, debuting and peaking at number 11 on the UK Singles Chart and number one on the US Billboard Dance Club Songs chart. It was followed by "Any Which Way", which features uncredited backing vocals by Kylie Minogue, to moderate success in European charts. "Invisible Light", which features guest vocals by actor Sir Ian McKellen, was released as the third and final single in December. Prior to this release, a promotional EP was made available on Boys Noize Records on August 16, 2010, featuring the original track as well as remixes by Boys Noize, Stuart Price, and Siriusmo. This EP was released on a transparent, yellow vinyl edition in addition to CD and download formats.

Critical reception

According to Metacritic the album was met with generally favorable reviews, reaching a metascore of 72 based on 21 reviews.

Commercial performance
The album debuted at number eighteen on the US Billboard 200, selling 18,260 copies in its first week, giving Scissor Sisters their second top-20 album.

In the UK, the album debuted at number two, behind Eminem's album Recovery, selling 46,071 copies.

Track listing

Personnel
 Jake Shears – vocals
 Babydaddy – bass guitar, guitar, keyboards, programming
 Ana Matronic – vocals
 Del Marquis – guitar
 Joan Wasser – string arrangement
 Kylie Minogue – backing vocals on "Any Which Way", sample of "Can't Get You Out of My Head" on "Something Like This"
 Santi White (Santigold) – backing vocals on "Running Out"
 Ian McKellen – vocals on "Invisible Light"
 Helen Terry – backing vocals on "Whole New Way"
 Randy Real (Randy Schrager) – drums, percussion
 John "JJ" Garden – keyboards
 Stuart Price – "everything in between"

Charts

Weekly charts

Year-end charts

References

2010 albums
Scissor Sisters albums
Albums produced by Stuart Price
Glam rock albums by American artists
Obscenity controversies in music